Astorga may refer to:

Places
Astorga, Spain, a municipality in the province of León, Castile and León, Spain
Astorga, Paraná, a municipality in the state of Paraná, Brazil
Roman Catholic Diocese of Astorga, a diocese whose seat is in the city of Astorga, Spain

Sports
Astorga FS, was a futsal club based in Astorga, Spain
Atlético Astorga FC, a football team based in Astorga, Spain

Other
Astorga (surname)